Cheshire Medical Center is the only hospital in Cheshire County, New Hampshire, United States. The 115-bed hospital is located in the city of Keene, the Cheshire County seat. It is part of the Dartmouth–Hitchcock health care network.

It was built in 1973 and replaced the Elliot Community Hospital on Main Street which had served as the city's hospital since 1892.

References

External links

Buildings and structures in Keene, New Hampshire
Hospitals in New Hampshire
Hospitals established in 1973
Hospital buildings completed in 1973
1973 establishments in New Hampshire